Hans Boskamp, born Johannes Hendricus Gerardus Hölscher, (7 May 1932 – 21 March 2011) was a Dutch footballer and actor.

Football career

Club
Rotterdam-born Hölscher moved with his family to Amsterdam at 10 years of age and joined Ajax under his father's stage name Boskamp. He played his first match for the club on 26 March 1950 and his final one on 27 May 1954. He then became a professional with BVC Amsterdam and played his final seasons for DWS.

International
Boskamp made his debut for the Netherlands in a September 1952 friendly match against Denmark and earned a total of four caps, scoring no goals. His final international was a May 1954 friendly match against Switzerland.

Entertainment career
After retiring as a footballer, Boskamp worked at the Amsterdam stock exchange and later became a singer and actor. He also worked for the Bovema record company and accompanied several big-name artists, among them John Lennon and Yoko Ono during their Bed-In in the Hilton Amsterdam. He also provided the Dutch dub of Sesame Street's Oscar the Grouch.

Later life and death
Boskamp died of a stroke on 21 March 2011, at the age of 78.

References

External links
 
 

1932 births
2011 deaths
Footballers from Rotterdam
Association football fullbacks
Dutch footballers
Netherlands international footballers
AFC Ajax players
AFC DWS players
20th-century Dutch male actors
Dutch music people